The Manawapou River is a river of the Taranaki Region of New Zealand's North Island. It flows southwest, from its origins in rough hill country to the northeast of Hāwera, to reach the South Taranaki Bight between Hāwera and Patea.

Geology 
The river rises on a sandy mid-Pliocene Tangahoe Mudstone, formed in a shallow sea, then its valley is cut down to early-Pliocene Whenuakura Group rocks (bioclastic limestone, pebbly and micaceous sandstones and massive siltstone), whilst the surrounding land is covered by mid-Pleistocene beach deposits of conglomerate, sand, peat and clay.

See also
List of rivers of New Zealand

References

South Taranaki District
Rivers of Taranaki
Rivers of New Zealand